Dexamethasone is a glucocorticoid medication used to treat rheumatic problems, a number of skin diseases, severe allergies, asthma, chronic obstructive lung disease, croup, brain swelling, eye pain following eye surgery, superior vena cava syndrome (a complication of some forms of cancer), and along with antibiotics in tuberculosis. In adrenocortical insufficiency, it may be used in combination with a mineralocorticoid medication such as fludrocortisone. In preterm labor, it may be used to improve outcomes in the baby. It may be given by mouth, as an injection into a muscle, as an injection into a vein, as a topical cream or ointment for the skin or as a topical ophthalmic solution to the eye. The effects of dexamethasone are frequently seen within a day and last for about three days.

The long-term use of dexamethasone may result in thrush, bone loss, cataracts, easy bruising, or muscle weakness. It is in pregnancy category C in the United States, meaning that it should only be used when the benefits are predicted to be greater than the risks. In Australia, the oral use is category A, meaning it has been frequently used in pregnancy and not been found to cause problems to the baby. It should not be taken when breastfeeding. Dexamethasone has anti-inflammatory and immunosuppressant effects.

Dexamethasone was first synthesized in 1957 by Philip Showalter Hench and was approved for medical use in 1958. It is on the World Health Organization's List of Essential Medicines. In 2020, it was the 272nd most commonly prescribed medication in the United States, with more than 1million prescriptions.

Medical uses

Anti-inflammatory
Dexamethasone is used to treat many inflammatory and autoimmune disorders, such as rheumatoid arthritis and bronchospasm. Idiopathic thrombocytopenic purpura, a decrease in numbers of platelets due to an immune problem, responds to 40 mg daily for four days; it may be administered in 14-day cycles. It is unclear whether dexamethasone in this condition is significantly better than other glucocorticoids.

It is also given in small amounts before and/or after some forms of dental surgery, such as the extraction of the wisdom teeth, an operation which often causes puffy, swollen cheeks.

Dexamethasone is commonly given as a treatment for croup in children, as a single dose can reduce the swelling of the airway to improve breathing and reduce discomfort.

It is injected into the heel when treating plantar fasciitis, sometimes in conjunction with triamcinolone acetonide.

It is useful to counteract allergic anaphylactic shock, if given in high doses.

It is present in certain eye drops – particularly after eye surgery – and as a nasal spray, and certain ear drops (can be combined with an antibiotic and an antifungal). Dexamethasone intravitreal steroid implants have been approved by the US Food and Drug Administration (FDA) to treat ocular conditions such as diabetic macular edema, central retinal vein occlusion, and uveitis. However, the evidence is poor quality relating to the treatment of uveitis, with the potential side effects (cataract progression and raised intraocular pressure) being significant, and the benefits not certainly greater than standard treatment. Dexamethasone has also been used with antibiotics to treat acute endophthalmitis.

Dexamethasone is used in transvenous screw-in cardiac pacing leads to minimize the inflammatory response of the myocardium. The steroid is released into the myocardium as soon as the screw is extended and can play a significant role in minimizing the acute pacing threshold due to the reduction of inflammatory response. The typical quantity present in a lead tip is less than 1.0 mg.

Dexamethasone may be administered before antibiotics in cases of bacterial meningitis. It acts to reduce the inflammatory response of the body to the bacteria killed by the antibiotics (bacterial death releases proinflammatory mediators that can cause a response which is harmful), thus reducing hearing loss and neurological damage.

Cancer
People with cancer undergoing chemotherapy are often given dexamethasone to counteract certain side effects of their antitumor treatments. Dexamethasone can increase the antiemetic effect of 5-HT3 receptor antagonists, such as ondansetron. The exact mechanism of this interaction is not well-defined, but it has been theorized that this effect may be due to, among many other causes, inhibition of prostaglandin synthesis, anti-inflammatory effects, immunosuppressive effects, decreased release of endogenous opioids, or a combination of the aforementioned.

In brain tumors (primary or metastatic), dexamethasone is used to counteract the development of edema, which could eventually compress other brain structures. It is also given in cord compression, where a tumor is compressing the spinal cord. Evidence on the safety and efficacy of using dexamethasone to treat malignant brain tumors is not clear.

Dexamethasone is also used as a direct chemotherapeutic agent in certain hematological malignancies, especially in the treatment of multiple myeloma, in which dexamethasone is given alone or in combination with other chemotherapeutic drugs, including most commonly with thalidomide (Thal-dex), lenalidomide, bortezomib (Velcade, Vel-dex), or a combination of doxorubicin (Adriamycin) and vincristine or bortezomib/lenalidomide/dexamethasone.

COVID-19

Dexamethasone is recommended by the National Health Service in the UK and the National Institutes of Health (NIH) in the US for people with COVID-19 who need either mechanical ventilation or supplemental oxygen (without ventilation).

The Infectious Diseases Society of America (IDSA) guideline panel suggests the use of glucocorticoids for people with severe COVID-19, defined as people with SpO2 ≤94% on room air, and those who require supplemental oxygen, mechanical ventilation, or extracorporeal membrane oxygenation (ECMO). The IDSA recommends against the use of glucocorticoids for those with COVID-19 without hypoxemia requiring supplemental oxygen.

The World Health Organization (WHO) recommends systemic corticosteroids rather than no systemic corticosteroids for the treatment of people with COVID-19 (strong recommendation, based on moderate certainty evidence). The WHO suggests not to use corticosteroids in the treatment of people with non-severe COVID-19 (conditional recommendation, based on low certainty evidence).

The Oxford University RECOVERY Trial issued a press release announcing preliminary results that the drug could reduce deaths by about a third in participants on ventilators and by about a fifth in participants on oxygen; it did not benefit people who did not require respiratory support. A meta-analysis of seven clinical trials of critically ill COVID-19 participants, each treated with one of three different corticosteroids found a statistically significant reduction in death. The largest reduction was obtained with dexamethasone (36% compared to placebo).

In September 2020, the European Medicines Agency (EMA) endorsed the use of dexamethasone in adults and adolescents, from twelve years of age and weighing at least , who require supplemental oxygen therapy. Dexamethasone can be taken by mouth or given as an injection or infusion (drip) into a vein.

In November 2020, the Public Health Agency of Canada's Clinical Pharmacology Task Group recommended dexamethasone for hospitalized patients requiring mechanical ventilation. Although dexamethasone, and other glucocorticoids, reduce mortality in COVID-19 they have also been associated with an increased risk of secondary infections, secondary infections being a significant issue in critically ill COVID-19 patients.

The mechanism of action of dexamethasone involves suppression of late-stage interferon type I programs in severe COVID-19 patients.

Surgery 
Dexamethasone is used fairly regularly to prevent postoperative nausea and vomiting, manage pain (potentially reduce the amount of pain medications needed), and to help reduce the amount of time spent in the hospital following surgery. It is often given as a single dose during surgery by intravenous administration. The adverse effects of taking steroids after surgery on wound healing, blood sugar levels, and in people with diabetes are not completely understood, however it is likely that dexamethasone does not increase the risk of postoperative infections.

Endocrine
Dexamethasone is the treatment for the very rare disorder of glucocorticoid resistance.

In adrenal insufficiency and Addison's disease, dexamethasone is prescribed when the patient does not respond well to prednisone or methylprednisolone.

It can be used in congenital adrenal hyperplasia in older adolescents and adults to suppress Adrenocorticotropic hormone (ACTH) production. It is typically given at night.

Pregnancy
Dexamethasone may be given to women at risk of delivering prematurely to promote maturation of the fetus' lungs. This administration, given from one day to one week before delivery, has been associated with low birth weight, although not with increased rates of neonatal death.

Dexamethasone has also been used during pregnancy as an off-label prenatal treatment for the symptoms of congenital adrenal hyperplasia (CAH) in female babies. CAH causes a variety of physical abnormalities, notably ambiguous genitalia. Early prenatal CAH treatment has been shown to reduce some CAH symptoms, but it does not treat the underlying congenital disorder. This use is controversial: it is inadequately studied, only around one in ten of the fetuses of women treated are at risk of the condition, and serious adverse events have been documented. Experimental use of dexamethasone in pregnancy for fetal CAH treatment was discontinued in Sweden when one in five cases had adverse events.

A small clinical trial found long-term effects on verbal working memory among the small group of children treated prenatally, but the small number of test subjects means the study cannot be considered definitive.

High-altitude illnesses
Dexamethasone is used in the treatment of high-altitude cerebral edema (HACE), as well as high-altitude pulmonary edema (HAPE). It is commonly carried on mountain-climbing expeditions to help climbers deal with complications of altitude sickness.

Nausea and vomiting
Intravenous dexamethasone is effective for prevention of nausea and vomiting in people who had surgery and whose post-operative pain was treated with long-acting spinal or epidural spinal opioids.

The combination of dexamethasone and a 5-HT3 receptor antagonist such as ondansetron is more effective than a 5-HT3 receptor antagonist alone in preventing postoperative nausea and vomiting.

Sore throat
A single dose of dexamethasone or another steroid speeds improvement of a sore throat.

Contraindications
Contraindications of dexamethasone include, but are not limited to:

 Uncontrolled infections
 Known hypersensitivity to dexamethasone
 Cerebral malaria
 Systemic fungal infection
 Concurrent treatment with live virus vaccines (including smallpox vaccine)

Adverse effects
The exact incidence of the adverse effects of dexamethasone are not available, hence estimates have been made as to the incidence of the adverse effects below based on the adverse effects of related corticosteroids and on available documentation on dexamethasone.

Common

 Acne
 Amnesia
 Birth defect
 Cataract (in cases of long-term treatment, it occurs in about 10% of patients)
 Confusion
 Depression
 Dyspepsia
 Euphoria
 Headaches
 Hiccups (in cases of long-term treatment, it occurs in about 11% of patients)
 Hyperglycemia
 Hypertension
 Impaired skin healing and wound repair
 Increased appetite
 Increased risk of viral, bacterial, fungal, and parasitic infections
 Insomnia
 Irritability
 Malaise
 Muscle atrophy and myopathy
 Nausea
 Ocular hypertension
 Osteoporosis
 Vertigo
 Vomiting
 Weight gain

Unknown frequency

 Abdominal distension
 Adrenal suppression
 Allergic reactions (including anaphylaxis)
 Arterial thrombosis
 Aspergillosis
 Bruising
 Candidiasis
 Cardiomyopathy
 Cleft palate
 Corneal or scleral thinning
 Cushing's syndrome
 Edema
 Esophageal ulcer
 Facial plethora
 Glaucoma
 Growth stunting (in children)
 Herpes zoster
 Hypernatremia
 Hypertriglyceridemia
 Hypocalcemia
 Hypokalemia
 Intracranial hypertension (long-term treatment)
 Leukocytosis
 Mania
 Mucormycosis
 Pancreatitis (inflammation of the pancreas)
 Papilledema
 Peptic ulcer
 Protein catabolism (causing nitrogen depletion)
 Psychological dependence
 Psychosis
 Seizures
 Skin atrophy
 Striae
 Telangiectasia
 Thromboembolism
 Venous thrombosis
 Vertebral collapse

Withdrawal
Sudden withdrawal after long-term treatment with corticosteroids can lead to:

 Adrenal insufficiency
 Arthralgia
 Conjunctivitis
 Death
 Fever
 Hypotension
 Myalgia
 Nodule (medicine) (painful, itchy skin condition)
 Rhinitis
 Weight loss

Interactions
Known drug interactions include:

 Inducers of hepatic microsomal enzymes such as barbiturates, phenytoin, and rifampicin can reduce the half-life of dexamethasone.
 Cotreatment with oral contraceptives can increase its volume of distribution.

Pharmacology

Pharmacodynamics
As a glucocorticoid, dexamethasone is an agonist of the glucocorticoid receptor (GR). It is highly selective for the GR over the mineralocorticoid receptor (MR), and in relation to this, has minimal mineralocorticoid activity. This is in contrast to endogenous corticosteroids like cortisol, which bind to and activate both the GR and the MR. Dexamethasone is 25 times more potent than hydrocortisone (cortisol) as a glucocorticoid. Its affinity (Ki) for the GR was about 1.2nM in one study.

The activation of the GR by dexamethasone results in dose-dependent suppression of the hypothalamic–pituitary–adrenal axis (HPA axis) and of production of endogenous corticosteroids by the adrenal glands, thereby reducing circulating endogenous concentrations of corticosteroids like cortisol and corticosterone.

Dexamethasone poorly penetrates the blood–brain barrier into the central nervous system due to binding to P-glycoprotein. However, higher doses of dexamethasone override the export capacity of P-glycoprotein and enter the brain to produce central activation of GRs. In conjunction with the suppression of endogenous corticosteroids by dexamethasone, this results in skewed ratios of activation of peripheral versus central GRs as well as skewed ratios of activation of GRs versus MRs when compared to non-synthetic corticosteroids. These differences can have significant clinical relevance.

Chemistry
Dexamethasone is a synthetic pregnane corticosteroid and derivative of cortisol (hydrocortisone) and is also known as 1-dehydro-9α-fluoro-16α-methylhydrocortisone or as 9α-fluoro-11β,17α,21-trihydroxy-16α-methylpregna-1,4-diene-3,20-dione. The molecular and crystal structure of dexamethasone has been determined by X-ray crystallography. It is a stereoisomer of betamethasone, the two compounds differing only in the spatial configuration of the methyl group at position 16 (see steroid nomenclature).

Synthesis
To synthesize dexamethasone, 16β-methylprednisolone acetate is dehydrated to the 9,11-dehydro derivative. This is then reacted with a source of hypobromite, such as basic N-bromosuccinimide, to form the 9α-bromo-11β-hydrin derivative, which is then ring-closed to an epoxide. A ring-opening reaction with hydrogen fluoride in tetrahydrofuran gives dexamethasone.

History
Dexamethasone was first synthesized by Philip Showalter Hench in 1957. It was introduced for medical use in 1958.

On 16 June 2020, the RECOVERY Trial announced preliminary results stating that dexamethasone improves survival rates of hospitalized patients with COVID-19 receiving oxygen or on a ventilator. Benefits were only observed in patients requiring respiratory support; those who did not require breathing support saw a worse survival rate than the control group, although the difference may have been due to chance.
A preprint containing the full dataset was published on 22 June 2020, and demand for dexamethasone surged after publication of the preprint. The preliminary report was published in The New England Journal of Medicine on 18 July 2020. The final report was published in February 2021.

The World Health Organization (WHO) states that dexamethasone should be reserved for seriously ill and critical patients receiving COVID-19 treatment in a hospital setting, and the WHO Director-General stated that "WHO emphasizes that dexamethasone should only be used for patients with severe or critical disease, under close clinical supervision. There is no evidence this drug works for patients with mild disease or as a preventative measure, and it could cause harm." In July 2020, the WHO stated they are in the process of updating treatment guidelines to include dexamethasone or other steroids. In September 2020, the WHO released updated guidance on using corticosteroids for COVID-19.

In July 2020, the European Medicines Agency (EMA) started reviewing results from the RECOVERY study arm that involved the use of dexamethasone in the treatment of patients with COVID-19 admitted to the hospital to provide an opinion on the results and in particular the potential use of dexamethasone for the treatment of adults with COVID-19. In September 2020, the EMA received an application for marketing authorization of dexamethasone for COVID-19.

Society and culture

Price
Dexamethasone is inexpensive. The drug is available in most areas of the world.

Nonmedical use
Dexamethasone is given in legal Bangladesh brothels to prostitutes not yet of legal age, causing weight gain aimed at making them appear older and healthier to customers and police.

Dexamethasone and most glucocorticoids are banned by sporting bodies including the World Anti-Doping Agency.

Veterinary use
Combined with marbofloxacin CAS number 115550-35-1and clotrimazole, dexamethasone is available under the name Aurizon, CAS number 50-02-2, and used to treat difficult ear infections, especially in dogs. It can also be combined with trichlormethiazide to treat horses with swelling of distal limbs and general bruising.

See also 
 Dexamethasone suppression test

References

External links 

 
 
 

AbbVie brands
Chemical substances for emergency medicine
COVID-19 drug development
CYP3A4 inducers
Fluorinated corticosteroids
Glucocorticoids
Halohydrins
Novartis brands
Organofluorides
Otologicals
Peripherally selective drugs
Pregnane X receptor agonists
Pregnanes
Wikipedia medicine articles ready to translate
World Health Organization essential medicines